Enteromius bagbwensis is a species of freshwater benthopelagic ray-finned fish in the genus Enteromius it is endemic to the Bagbwe River in Sierra Leone.  The current maximum length is a 9.6 cm male.

Description
This fish has 12 scales around caudal penducle, 8 branched dorsal fin rays, and two pairs of rather long barbels.  The anterior barbel does not reach to the anterior margin of the eye. It has a posterior barbel extending beyond the hind margin of its eye.  This fish also has a complete lateral line and slightly depressed below dorsal fin.

References 

Enteromius
Taxa named by John Roxborough Norman
Fish described in 1932